Ho Chi Minh City National University of Pedagogy (HCMUP, Vietnamese: Trường Đại học Sư phạm Thành phố Hồ Chí Minh), or Ho Chi Minh City University of Education, is a university specializing in tertiary-level training of teachers and lecturers located in District 5. HCMUP is one of fourteen leading national universities of Vietnam and one of the two largest pedagogical universities, playing a leading role in teacher and lecturer training.

History
It was founded as the Saigon National Pedagogical University in 1957 and reestablished by prime ministerial decree in 1976. In 1995, the university was incorporated in Ho Chi Minh City National University, then it became an autonomous university with the current name in 1999. In 2020, it became National Key Universities of Vietnam and the leading university in the field of education and pure science research.

Between 1976 and 2006, the university educated 65,945 graduates, of which 1,000 were postgraduates. It also offered training for 33,800 teachers and has education cooperations with over 50 universities worldwide.

Organization
The university has 821 staff, of which 533 are faculty teachers (31 professors and associate professors, 131 Ph.D.s, 232 Masters).

Management
Vice-Chancellor: Professor Huỳnh Văn Sơn, Ph.D.
Deputy Vice-Chancellor:

Faculties, departments, and centers

The university has 20 faculties: 
 Mathematics-Informatics, Information Technology, Physics, Chemistry, Biology, Literature, History, Geography, Political Education, Educational Sciences, Psychology, Primary Education, Early Childhood Education, Physical Education, National Defense Education, Special Education, English language, Chinese language, French language, Russian language, Japanese language. Korean language.
Three teams and subordinate divisions: 
 Women Affairs Education, Non-vocational Education, Special Education.
Seven centers:
 IT, Foreign Languages, Environmental and Population Education, Asian-Pacific Francophone, Thuan An Disabled Children, Chinese Language and Culture, University Entry Test Training.
The Institute for Education Research with six research centers:
High School Education
Tertiary Education Research
Education Appraisal and Verification
Teaching Process
Pedagogical Skill Development
International Education and Cultural Exchange
The Applied College

Administrative departments
The university has twelve departments and divisions: Personnel-Administration, Training, Sciences, Technology and Postgraduate Education, Planning-Financial, International Cooperation, Propaganda, Equipment Control, Internal Publishing, Library, Dormitory, Health Care, and Social Associations.

Campuses
The university has four campuses and one dormitory:

 Campus 1: 280 An Dương Vương Street, Ward 4, District 5, Ho Chi Minh City
 Campus 2 and main library: 222 Lê Văn Sỹ Street, Ward 14, District 3, Ho Chi Minh City
 Education Research Institute: 115 Hai Bà Trưng, District 1, Ho Chi Minh City
 Center for Disabled Children Education of Thuận An: Bình Đức, Lái Thiêu Township, Thuận An, Bình Dương Province
 Dormitory: 351 Lạc Long Quân Street, District 11, Ho Chi Minh City

External links
 Official website
 Official Facebook page

Universities in Ho Chi Minh City